Carnoustie railway station is a railway station which serves the town of Carnoustie, Angus, Scotland. There is a crossover at the south end of the station, which can be used to facilitate trains turning back if the line north to Arbroath is blocked. ScotRail manage the station and provide almost all services.

Carnoustie station was refurbished by Galliford Try Rail prior to the 2007 Open Golf Championship which was held at the adjacent golf course.

History

The station was opened on 6 October 1838 on the 5 ft 6in gauge (1676mm) Dundee and Arbroath Railway. The station was originally built on the west side of Station Road, to the north of the running line. The goods yard was to the north of the station and mostly accessed via a turntable. The railway changed to standard gauge in 1847.

In 1900 the station was relocated to the other side of the running line and to the other side of Station Road, the goods yard remained where it was and expanded into some of the space the station had used, by this time the access became the usual set of points. The goods yard was able to accommodate most types of goods including live stock and was equipped with a three-ton crane.

A camping coach was positioned here by the Scottish Region from 1956 to 1960, which was replaced in 1961 by a Pullman camping coach. This was joined by another Pullman in 1964 until 1967 when they were withdrawn.

Facilities 

There are shelters, benches and help points on both platforms, whilst platform 1 is also equipped with a ticket machine. There is a car park, and cycle racks, adjoining platform 2. Both platforms have step-free access, and are linked by a footbridge.

Passenger volume 

The statistics cover twelve month periods that start in April.

Services
As of May 2022, there is a roughly hourly service in each direction, between Dundee and Arbroath, with some trains to Aberdeen, Glasgow Queen Street and Edinburgh Waverley. The Caledonian Sleeper also picks up (southbound) and sets down (southbound) passengers here. On Sundays, going northbound, there are 5 trains a day to Aberdeen. Going southbound, there 4 trains to Edinburgh (including the Caledonian Sleeper), 1 to Glasgow Queen Street and 1 to Perth.

References

External Links 

 Video footage of the station on YouTube

Railway stations in Angus, Scotland
Former Dundee and Arbroath Railway stations
Railway stations in Great Britain opened in 1838
Railway stations in Great Britain closed in 1900
Railway stations in Great Britain opened in 1900
Railway stations served by ScotRail
Railway stations served by Caledonian Sleeper
1838 establishments in Scotland
Carnoustie